Judith of Bethulia (1914) is an American film starring Blanche Sweet and Henry B. Walthall, and produced and directed by D. W. Griffith, based on the play "Judith and the Holofernes" (1896) by Thomas Bailey Aldrich, which itself was an adaptation of the Book of Judith. The film was the first feature-length film made by pioneering film company Biograph, although the second that Biograph released.

Shortly after its completion and a disagreement Griffith had with Biograph executives on making more future feature-length films, Griffith left Biograph, and took the entire stock company with him. Biograph delayed the picture's release until 1914, after Griffith's departure, so that it would not have to pay him in a profit-sharing agreement they had.

Synopsis
The film is based on the deuterocanonical Book of Judith. During the siege of the Jewish city of Bethulia by the Assyrians, a widow named Judith (Blanche Sweet) has a plan to stop the war  as her people suffer starvation and are ready to surrender.

The widow disguises herself as a harem girl and goes to the enemy camp, where she beguiles a general of King Nebuchadnezzar, whose army is besieging the city. Judith seduces Holofernes (Henry Walthall), then while he is drunk cuts off his head with a sabre. She returns to her city, a heroine.

Cast

 Blanche Sweet - Judith
 Henry B. Walthall - Holofernes
 Mae Marsh - Naomi
 Robert Harron - Nathan
 Lillian Gish - The young mother
 Dorothy Gish - The crippled beggar
 Kate Bruce - Judith's maid
 J. Jiquel Lanoe - Eunuch Attendant
 Harry Carey - Assyrian Traitor
 W. Chrystie Miller - Bethulian
 Gertrude Robinson
 Charles Hill Mailes - Bethulian Soldier
 Edward Dillon
 Gertrude Bambrick - Lead Assyrian Dancer
 Lionel Barrymore - Extra
 Clara T. Bracy - Bethulian
 Kathleen Butler - Bethulian
 William J. Butler - Bethulian
 Christy Cabanne
 William A. Carroll - Assyrian Soldier (as William Carroll)
 Frank Evans - Bethulian Soldier
 Mary Gish
 Harry Hyde - Bethulian Soldier/Assyrian Soldier
 Thomas Jefferson (actor)
 Jennie Lee - Bethulian
 Adolph Lestina - Bethulian
 Elmo Lincoln
 Antonio Moreno - Extra
 Marshall Neilan
 Frank Opperman - Bethulian
 Alfred Paget - Bethulian/Assyrian Soldier
 W. C. Robinson - Bethulian Soldier
 Kate Toncray - One of Judith's Servants

Reviews
The reviews were favorable:
Variety, March 27, 1914, wrote: "It is not easy to confess one's self unequal to a given task, but to pen an adequate description of the Biograph's production of Judith of Bethulia is, to say the least, a full grown man's job."

The Moving Picture World, March 7, 1914, described it as: "A fascinating work of high artistry, Judith of Bethulia will not only rank as an achievement in this country, but will make foreign producers sit up and take notice."

See also
D. W. Griffith filmography
Lillian Gish filmography
Blanche Sweet filmography
Lionel Barrymore filmography

References

External links

 
 
 Judith of Bethulia at SilentEra
 
Judith of Bethulia available for free download at Internet Archive

American silent feature films
American epic films
Religious epic films
1914 films
American black-and-white films
Silent American drama films
1914 drama films
Films directed by D. W. Griffith
Films about Jews and Judaism
Biograph Company films
Judith in film
Articles containing video clips
Films based on the Bible
American films based on plays
Films with screenplays by Frank E. Woods
Films based on adaptations
1910s American films
Silent horror films